Andres Institute of Art is a public sculpture park in Brookline, New Hampshire, United States, founded in 1996 by local benefactor Paul Andres and sculptor John Weidman. The sculptures are situated in a variety of garden and forested situations, spread over eleven hiking trails on the hillside. The trails range from easy to difficult, and the views along them change drastically with the changing of the seasons. Most of the sculptures are abstract and cryptic pieces, with each year's accessions coming from both new artists and familiar ones. The trails lead visitors by works such as Contempo Rustic, a couch fashioned from slabs of rock and metal, or Mbari House, a house-shaped granite-and-metal totem to peace and friendship.

Since 1998, the institute has sponsored an annual Bridges and Connections International Sculpture Symposium. Artists are invited to visit Brookline for two weeks to create sculptures for permanent display at the institute. Sculptors from Lithuania, Latvia, England, Czech Republic, Ukraine, Egypt, Greece, Chile, and many states of the U.S. have attended the event. As the artists work, the public is invited to observe and interact with them, and to join guided tours of the collection.

See also
List of sculpture parks
Sculpture trail

References

External links
 Andres Institute of Art website

Art in New Hampshire
Art museums and galleries in New Hampshire
Museums in Hillsborough County, New Hampshire
Brookline, New Hampshire
Sculpture gardens, trails and parks in the United States